John William Henry II (born September 13, 1949) is an American businessman and investor and the founder of John W. Henry & Company, an investment management firm. He is the principal owner of Liverpool Football Club, the Boston Red Sox, The Boston Globe, and co-owner of RFK Racing. As of November 2021, Forbes estimated his net worth to be $3.6 billion.

Early life
John William Henry II was born on September 13, 1949 in Quincy, Illinois.  His parents were soybean farmers, and he split his time growing up between Illinois and Arkansas. His asthmatic condition at the age of 15 prompted his family to move to Apple Valley, California. After his graduation from Victor Valley High School in Victorville, he attended Victor Valley College, then the University of California (at Riverside, Irvine, and Los Angeles), where he majored in philosophy but did not graduate — partly the result of performing on the road in two bands, Elysian Fields and Hillary.

Henry started trading corn and soybean futures to learn the basics of hedging the price risk of holding an inventory of these commodities, whether in storage or out in the field. In 1976, a commodities broker at Reynolds Securities asked him to advise other farmers, but he declined. After spending a summer in Norway with his first wife, Mai, Henry developed a mechanical trend following method for managing a futures trading account. He tested his trend-reversal method—which was never out of the market but always held a position (either long or short) in every one of the markets in the account's "basket" of commodities—"using his own money" (in the words of his marketing literature of 1983). When that test proved successful, he founded John W. Henry & Company in 1981, opened a small office across the street from the airport in Irvine, California, and began marketing his management to the largest commodity brokerage firms in America. That proved so successful by 1983 that he moved to considerably larger quarters at Fashion Island in Newport Beach. In 1989, Henry moved to Westport, Connecticut. Two years later, Henry established a second office in Boca Raton.

John W. Henry & Company, Inc.
JWH was established in 1981 and began taking retail clients in 1982.

The firm's management methods make mechanical, non-discretionary trading decisions in response to systematic determinations of reversals in each market's direction, with the explicit intention of precluding not only human emotion, but also any subjective evaluation of factors outside of price behavior (such as the so-called fundamentals), to trigger each decision to be long or short each market, or not. 

In March 2006, Boston estimated Henry's net worth at $1.1 billion but noted that his firm had recently experienced difficulties. 

On November 9, 2012, the firm announced that it would stop managing clients' money by December 31, 2012, and Henry confirmed that total assets under the firm's management had fallen from $2.5 billion in 2006 to less than $100 million as of late 2012.

Sports ownership

John W. Henry grew up a fan of the St. Louis Cardinals, especially their star Stan Musial. After acquiring his fortune, his first foray into professional sports was in purchasing a Minor League Baseball team, the Tucson Toros of the Pacific Coast League, in 1989. He was also one of the founders of the Senior Professional Baseball Association, a winter league in Florida composed of retired major league players. Henry co-owned the winning team in the 1989–90 season, the West Palm Beach Tropics, managed by former Boston Red Sox "Impossible Dream" (1967) manager, Dick Williams. Henry sold his interest in 1990, and the league went out of business the following year. In 1990, Henry negotiated to purchase the Orlando Magic NBA team, for a short time was the lead general for an expansion team which became the Colorado Rockies, and headed a group attempting to land an NHL expansion bid in Florida, which would eventually be given to Phil and Tony Esposito, who created the Tampa Bay Lightning. Subsequently, Henry negotiated to buy the Miami Heat and later the New Jersey Nets.

Henry entered Major League Baseball with his purchase of a small interest in the New York Yankees in 1991. Henry became the sole owner of the Florida Marlins in 1999, purchasing the club from Wayne Huizenga for a reported $158 million. In January 2002, Henry sold the Marlins in a multi-franchise deal to Jeffrey Loria, then owner of the Montreal Expos (now the Washington Nationals).

Boston Red Sox
Following his sale of the Marlins, Henry led a purchase of the Boston Red Sox with partners Tom Werner and the New York Times Company from the Yawkey Trust headed by John Harrington. Henry, as principal owner and Werner, as chairman, assembled a front office team headed up by Larry Lucchino with the express goal of "breaking the Curse of the Bambino." He also hired baseball sabermetrics pioneer Bill James, whose work became widely known following the publication of Moneyball in 2003. Henry accomplished his championship goal in the 2004 World Series, against his former childhood favorite Cardinals, and beat the Cardinals again in 2013. The team also won the 2007 World Series against a franchise with which Henry had pre-expansion involvement, the Rockies, and the 2018 World Series against the Dodgers. Henry is also responsible for saving Fenway Park from the wrecking ball.  The previous Red Sox owners had planned on building a new Fenway Park next door, but Henry chose to keep and renovate (including new seats over the Green Monster) the current Fenway Park, which celebrated its centennial in 2012.

Henry was in the news in August 2017, when he said the team would lead a campaign to change the name of Yawkey Way, where Fenway Park is located. The Red Sox had been the last team in Major League Baseball to integrate, and Henry said, "I am still haunted by what went on here a long time before we arrived." The change was approved by the City of Boston in April 2018, and the name reverted to Jersey Street in May 2018.

Henry also enjoys playing baseball simulations, including Out of the Park Baseball.

Fenway Sports Group

Henry and Werner established New England Sports Ventures in 2001. The company owns the Boston Red Sox, 80% of the New England Sports Network (which also carries the NHL's Boston Bruins), Fenway Park, Fenway Sports Management (a sports marketing and management firm), various real estate properties surrounding Fenway Park,  English Football club  Liverpool F.C., and are majority owners of the Pittsburgh Penguins of the National Hockey League.

In 2009, the company made its first foray into European sports with an unsuccessful bid for the French Ligue 1 club Olympique de Marseille.

In 2010, New England Sports Ventures changed its name to Fenway Sports Group.

Liverpool Football Club
In October 2010 the Fenway Sports Group took over Liverpool F.C. The UEFA Financial Fair Play Regulations may have been a factor in the decision. The previous owners, Tom Hicks and George N. Gillett, Jr., had become extremely unpopular among Liverpool fans for their failure to deliver on the promise of a new stadium or on the promise that no debt would be placed onto the club, as well as disrespectful treatment of its manager and front office and for their allegedly misleading statements about planned and past investment in players. Having lost around £154 million on the pressured sale of their debt-ridden club, Hicks and Gillett announced that they would sue co-owners and creditors for at least $1.6 billion for the "extraordinary swindle" they suffered. In January 2013, Hicks and Gillett had lost a Court of Appeal case and agreed to drop the suit.

On February 26, 2012 Liverpool won the 2012 Football League Cup Final at Wembley Stadium, beating Cardiff City 3–2 on penalties after the game finished 1–1 after 90 minutes and 2–2 after extra time. This was Liverpool's first trophy since the 2006 FA Cup Final win over West Ham United on May 13, 2006 at the Millennium Stadium in Cardiff. In May 2012 he made a controversial decision by firing manager and club icon Kenny Dalglish citing the club's poor league results. This was regarded as a poor decision by some football pundits such as Dalglish's friend Alan Hansen, given Dalglish's success in lifting the club from four points above the relegation zone to a cup win. In July 2012, after successfully persuading Brendan Rodgers to become the new manager, John Henry stated the reason behind parting company with Dalglish had not been due to failing to win the FA Cup, nor the Suarez case (as assumed by Manchester United manager, Sir Alex Ferguson), but due to the club's poor league performance in the second half of the 2011–12 season.

Rodgers almost took Liverpool to their first Premier League title in over 20 years during the 2013–14 season; however, poor performances in the subsequent season and a bad start to the 2015–16 season saw Henry sack Brendan Rodgers as Liverpool manager on October 4, 2015. On October 8, 2015, Henry appointed Jürgen Klopp as the new manager of Liverpool F.C. The move was praised by Liverpool supporters and seen as a show of Henry's ambition for the club. Klopp led Liverpool to two finals during the 2015–16 season (the League Cup and the Europa League). In 2018 Liverpool reached the Champions League final for the first time in 11 years. In 2019 Liverpool reached the Champions League Final for the second consecutive year and won it, beating fellow English club Tottenham Hotspur, 2–0. Liverpool went on to win the Premier League title in the 2019–20 season; Liverpool's first league title in 30 years, and their first since the Premier League was formed.

In April 2021, Liverpool were announced as a founding member of the European Super League, which would have effectively ended the pyramid system of European football and placed Liverpool in a closed league without prospects for meritocratic relegation and promotion. Liverpool and the five other English clubs involved backed out within two days after a strong backlash. This prompted Henry to issue an official apology to Liverpool fans, taking responsibility for the events that had occurred.

NASCAR
In 2007, Henry's Fenway Sports Group bought a 50% stake in Jack Roush's Roush Racing stock car racing team. Driver Matt Kenseth won the Auto Club 500 at the California Speedway in February 2007 marking Henry's first win as an owner. In February 2009 the team won their first Daytona 500 with Matt Kenseth. Henry is currently listed as the owner of the #17 Ford driven by NASCAR Cup Series driver Chris Buescher.

iRacing.com Motorsport Simulations
In September 2004 Henry and David Kaemmer founded iRacing.com Motorsport Simulations for developing a racing simulation service aimed at both real-world racers and racing simulator enthusiasts. The service was launched in August 2008.

Newspaper ownership
In the predawn hours of August 3, 2013, both The Boston Globe and The New York Times carried stories on their web sites reporting that Henry had agreed to purchase the former along with the Telegram & Gazette newspaper of Worcester, Massachusetts and related New England media properties for $70 million in cash from The New York Times Company, which had paid $1.1 billion for The Globe in 1993. The Globes story described Henry as "a personally shy businessman with a history of bold bets." The Times story quoted Times spokesperson Eileen Murphy as confirming the sale deal.

The stories noted that Henry had initially been among a group of partners who had joined in bidding on The Globe properties, but ended up agreeing to acquire them individually. However, The Times story reported him saying: "In coming days there will be announcements concerning those joining me in this community commitment and effort."

After the announcement, the ownership of The San Diego Union-Tribune (then known as "U-T San Diego") alleged that it had outbid Henry for The Globe but that the management of The Times Company had not fairly handled the process, to the detriment of Times Company shareholders.

In 2014, Henry sold the Worcester Telegram & Gazette to Halifax Media Group, which had previously purchased 16 former New York Times Company newspapers in 2011.

In popular culture
Henry was briefly portrayed by Arliss Howard in the 2011 film Moneyball, which follows Oakland Athletics general manager Billy Beane and his quest to build a winning team in 2002. Towards the end of the film, Beane travels to Boston's Fenway Park where he meets with Henry, who wants Beane to become the new GM of the Red Sox. The film notes that Beane turned down a five-year, $12.5 million contract with Boston and returned to Oakland, but adds that the Red Sox, despite failing to hire Beane, did implement many of his "Moneyball" ideas and would go on to win the 2004 World Series, marking the first Red Sox championship in 86 years.

Awards and honors
 Four-time World Series champion (as principal owner of the Boston Red Sox)

References

External links

 
 John W. Henry & Company Inc.
 Street Stories profile

1949 births
American billionaires
American commodities traders
American currency traders
American derivatives traders
American financial analysts
American financiers
American investors
American money managers
American soccer chairmen and investors
Boston Red Sox owners
Businesspeople from Arkansas
Businesspeople from California
Businesspeople from Illinois
Liverpool F.C. chairmen and investors
Living people
Miami Marlins owners
Major League Baseball owners
NASCAR team owners
People from Quincy, Illinois
People from Victorville, California
Stock and commodity market managers
University of California, Riverside alumni
21st-century American newspaper publishers (people)
Journalists from California
People from Apple Valley, California
Fenway Sports Group people